The cross and flame is the official symbol of the United Methodist Church since 1968.

History
Adopted shortly after the merger of The Methodist Church and the Evangelical United Brethren Church, the symbol relates the United Methodist church to God through Christ (cross) and the Holy Spirit (flame). The flame is a reminder of Pentecost when witnesses were unified by the power of the Holy Spirit and saw "tongues, as of fire". The two tongues of a single flame may also be understood to represent the union of two denominations. The two separate flames represent the Evangelical United Brethren Church and the Methodist Church coming together to form the United Methodist Church.

Usage
The cross and flame was registered as a trademark in 1971 (for the purpose of preventing its misuse) and is intended only for official United Methodist agencies, including local churches.

Proposal for replacement
In September of 2020, the North Texas Annual Conference voted 558-176 at its annual meeting to send legislation to the 2021 General Conference, the denomination’s global decision-making body, to begin the process for changing the logo due to its association with the racist imagery of a burning cross.

See also

Wesley Foundation

References

External links
 The Cross and Flame: A Personal Memoir at GCFA
 Death of Creator of UM Cross and Flame Logo at The Church on the Cape

United Methodist Church
Cross symbols